Updesh Kumar, Ph.D., is Scientist ‘G' (R) and the former Head of Mental Health, Follow-Up, and Technical Coordination Division at Defence Institute of Psychological Research (DIPR), R & D Organization (DRDO), Ministry of Defence, Delhi. He specializes in the area of personality assessment, suicidal behavior, military psychology, counseling psychology, and health psychology. He was involved in the selection of officers for the Indian Armed Forces, and worked with DRDO, Ministry of Defence, Delhi for about three decades.

Books

References

External links
 Updesh Kumar's website
 Author Profile, Sage Publishing.
 https://www.wiley.com/en-us/The+Wiley+Handbook+of+Personality+Assessment-p-9781119173496

Living people
Year of birth missing (living people)
Defence Research and Development Organisation
Indian psychologists
Panjab University alumni